Pillman is a surname. Notable people with the surname include:

Brian Pillman (1962–1997), American professional wrestler
Brian Pillman Jr. (born 1993), American professional wrestler
Charles Pillman (1890–1955), English rugby union player
Robert Pillman (1893–1916), English rugby union player